Laurence Kaptain (born 1952, Elgin, Illinois, US) is an American symphonic cimbalom artist. He is dean of the College of Arts & Media University of Colorado Denver and has served as Dean of the Louisiana State University College of Music & Dramatic Arts, where he was a faculty member in the School of Music. Until 2009, he served as dean of Shenandoah Conservatory in Winchester, Virginia. From 2004 to 2006 he was director of the Schwob School of Music at Columbus State University in Columbus, Georgia.

Born to a father of Hungarian ancestry, Kaptain was exposed to the cimbalom at an early age at ethnic social functions in his hometown of Elgin, Illinois and later was awarded a grant to study cimbalom in Budapest, Hungary.  He was the first individual to receive the Doctor of Musical Arts degree in percussion instruments from the University of Michigan and has served on the faculty of several conservatories and university music programs.

Kaptain has collaborated with many solo and chamber artists, including Dawn Upshaw, Gil Shaham, Monica Germino, Lucy Shelton, John Jorgenson, Gilles Apap and Robert McDuffie.  He is heard regularly with the Minnesota Orchestra, as well as the St. Paul Chamber Orchestra, and has been featured with the MET Chamber Players and the Ensemble Sospeso in Carnegie Hall. In 1998 he appeared with the Chicago Symphony in 4 live concerts and a CD recording for DGG under Pierre Boulez with violinist Gil Shaham. He has also been heard at the Canada's DuMaurier Contemporary Music Festival and national broadcast on the CBC, Tanglewood Music Festival, the Aspen Music Festival, Milwaukee Symphony, Philadelphia Orchestra, Detroit Symphony, as well as with the Montreal Symphony in a special video recording for Japan's NHK Television Network.  Kaptain has performed under many noted conductors, including James Levine, Pierre Boulez, the late Sir Georg Solti, James Conlon, H. Robert Reynolds, Leonard Slatkin, Gilbert Varga.

Albums
 Suite from Hary Janos (Kodály), Chicago Symphony Orchestra, Neeme Järvi, conductor (solo cimbalom). Recorded February, 1990 (released Spring, 1991). Chandos (CHAN 8877)..
 Suite from Hary Janos (Kodály), St. Louis Symphony Orchestra, Leonard Slatkin, conductor (solo cimbalom). Recorded February, 1993 (released November, 2007). AAM 070106
 Suite from Hary Janos (Kodály), Chicago Symphony Orchestra, Sir Georg Solti, conductor (solo cimbalom). Recorded November, 1993. U.S. release (11/94): Mephisto Magic (London/Decca 443 444-2), European release (10/94): The Hungarian Connection (Decca 443 444-2).
 Renard, Ragtime (Stravinsky), St. Paul Chamber Orchestra, Hugh Wolff, music director. Teldec 4509-94548-2.
 Bartók Rhapsody No. 1 for Violin and Orchestra. Chicago Symphony, Pierre Boulez, Principal Guest Conductor with Gil Shaham, violin. CD recording for Deutsche Grammophon DGG 289 459 639-2. 2000.
 Ragtime (Stravinsky), Orpheus Chamber Ensemble (New York City), Deutsche Grammophon, 289 453458-2. 2001
 Bartók Rhapsody No. 1 for Violin and Orchestra. Chicago Symphony, Pierre Boulez, Principal Guest Conductor with Gil Shaham, violin. CD recording for Deutsche Grammophon DGG 289 459 639-2. 2000.

Bibliography

Kaptain, Laurence D. The Wood that Sings:  The Marimba in Chiapas, Mexico. Honeyrock, 1992.
Kaptain, Laurence D. "Maderas que cantan." Tuxtla Gutiérrez, Chiapas, México : Gobierno del Estado de Chiapas, Consejo Estatal de Fomento a la Investigación y Diifusión de la Cultura, 1991.

References

External links

American classical musicians
American people of Hungarian descent
Cimbalom players
1952 births
Living people
People from Elgin, Illinois
University of Michigan School of Music, Theatre & Dance alumni